Stefano Raffaele (born March 15, 1970) is an Italian comics book artist.

Biography
Born in Milan, his first published work was in Lazarus Ledd #4 in 1994. From the following year, he worked for American comics series such as New Gods, Birds of Prey, Batman, X-Men Adventures, X-Factor and Conan the Barbarian. In 2000, he pencilled Arkhain, a science-fiction mini-series published by Marvel Italia. He also wrote and drew Fragile which appeared in Metal Hurlant magazine.

In 2007, it was announced that Fragile would be made into a film to be directed by Eduardo Rodriguez.

Bibliography

Comics work includes:
The Blackburne Covenant (with writer Fabian Nicieza, 4-issue mini-series, Dark Horse Comics, 2003, hardcover)
Fragile (script and art, in Metal Hurlant magazine, #4, 7–8, 10–14, 2003–2004, tpb, DC Comics, 168 pages, 2005)

Notes

References

External links

1970 births
Living people
Artists from Milan
Italian comics artists